James C. Cook (November 27, 1888 – August 21, 1979) was an American football offensive guard who played two games for the Green Bay Packers. He played in 1921. He also served in the United States Army. He died in Green Bay, Wisconsin on August 21, 1979 at the age of 90.

References

External links

1888 births
1979 deaths
Sportspeople from Green Bay, Wisconsin
Players of American football from Wisconsin
Green Bay Packers players
American football offensive guards
University of Notre Dame alumni
Notre Dame Fighting Irish football players
Green Bay East High School alumni